Agh Bolagh-e Kuranlu (also Romanized as Āgh Bolāgh-e Kūrānlū; also known as Āq Bolāgh, Āqbolāgh, and Āq Bolāgh-e Kūrānlū) is a village in Charuymaq-e Jonubesharqi Rural District of Shadian District, Charuymaq County, East Azerbaijan province, Iran. At the 2006 National Census, its population was 637 in 125 households. The following census in 2011 counted 715 people in 175 households. The latest census in 2016 showed a population of 597 people in 175 households; it was the largest village in its rural district.

References 

Charuymaq County

Populated places in East Azerbaijan Province

Populated places in Charuymaq County